Stephen Gough (born 1959) is a British activist known as "The Naked Rambler"

Stephen Gough is also the name of:
Stephen Gough (footballer) (born 1981), Irish footballer
Stephen Gough (speed skater) (born 1972), Canadian short track speed skater
Stephen Gough (politician), Canadian politician